The Philippines participated in the first ever Asian Games held in New Delhi, India on 5 to 10 March 1951. With 5 golds, 6 silvers and 8 bronzes, this country was ranked 5th in the medal tally and 3rd place in the over-all medal count.

Asian Games performance
The country's delegation of 39 athletes won its 19 medals in only four sports - swimming, basketball, athletics and weightlifting. There were no women athletes in the country's first Asian Games team.

Medalists

Gold

Silver

Bronze

Multiple

Medal summary

Medal by sports

References

Nations at the 1951 Asian Games
1951
Asian Games